A referendum on the Act of Declaration of Independence was held in Ukraine on 1 December 1991. An overwhelming majority of 92.3% of voters approved the declaration of independence made by the Verkhovna Rada on 24 August 1991.

Voters were asked "Do you support the Act of Declaration of Independence of Ukraine?" The text of the Declaration was included as a preamble to the question. The referendum was called by the Parliament of Ukraine to confirm the Act of Independence, which was adopted by the Parliament on 24 August 1991. Citizens of Ukraine expressed overwhelming support for independence. In the referendum, 31,891,742 registered voters (or 84.18% of the electorate) took part, and among them 28,804,071 (or 92.3%) voted "Yes".

On the same day, a presidential election took place.  In the month up to the presidential election, all six candidates campaigned across Ukraine in favour of independence from the Soviet Union, and a "Yes" vote in the referendum.  Leonid Kravchuk, the parliament chairman and de facto head of state, was elected to serve as the first President of Ukraine.

From 2 December 1991 onwards, Ukraine was globally recognized by other countries as an independent state. Also on 2 December, the President of the Russian SFSR Boris Yeltsin recognized Ukraine as independent. In a telegram of congratulations Soviet President Mikhail Gorbachev sent to Kravchuk soon after the referendum, Gorbachev included his hopes for close Ukrainian cooperation and understanding in "the formation of a union of sovereign states".

Ukraine was the second-most powerful republic in the Soviet Union both economically and politically (behind Russia), and its secession ended any realistic chance of Gorbachev keeping the USSR together.  By December 1991 all former Soviet Republics except the RSFSR and the Kazakh SSR had formally seceded from the Union. A week after his election, Kravchuk joined with Yeltsin and Belarusian leader Stanislav Shushkevich in signing the Belavezha Accords, which declared that the Soviet Union had ceased to exist. The USSR officially dissolved on 26 December.

Results

Ukrainian media had converted en masse to the independence ideal.

Polls showed 63% support for the "Yes" campaign in September 1991; that grew to 77% in the first week of October 1991 and 88% by mid-November 1991.

55% of the ethnic Russians in Ukraine voted for independence.

By region
The Act of Independence was supported by a majority of participating voters in each of the 27 administrative regions of Ukraine: 24 oblasts, 1 autonomous republic, and 2 special municipalities (Kyiv City and Sevastopol City). Voter turnout was lowest in Eastern and Southern Ukraine. The six regions with the lowest percentage of "yes" votes were Kharkiv, Luhansk, Donetsk, and Odessa Oblasts, Crimea, and Sevastopol; all of those regions still had a majority of registered voters marking their ballots "yes", except for Crimea and Sevastopol.

See also

 Dissolution of the Soviet Union
2014 Donbas status referendums
2014 Crimean status referendum
Russo-Ukrainian War (2014present)

References

External links
 
 
 "The funeral of the empire", Leonid Kravchuk, Zerkalo Nedeli (Mirror Weekly), 23 August – 1 September 2001. Available online in Russian and in Ukrainian.
 "Confide in people," Dr. Stanislav Kulchytsky, Zerkalo Nedeli (Mirror Weekly), 1–7 December 2001. Available online in Russian and in Ukrainian.
Vitaliy Riaboshapka. "Referendum in Ukraine: how it is dangerous and why it is even needed (Референдум в Украине: чем опасен и зачем вообще нужен)". Segodnya. 1 December 2019

Referendums in Ukraine
Ukraine
Ukraine
Independence referendum
1991 in the Soviet Union
1991 in international relations
Referendums in the Soviet Union
Dissolution of the Soviet Union
Ukrainian independence movement
December 1991 events in Europe